A halite, also known as a halogenite, is an oxyanion containing a halogen in a III oxidation state. It is the conjugate base of a halous acid. The known halites are chlorite, bromite, and iodite.

Uses
Halites can be used to generate the respective halogen dioxides via a one-electron oxidation:
5 NaClO2 + 4 HCl → 5 NaCl + 4  + 2 H2O
 + HBrO3 + H+ → 2   + H2O
This reaction in particular is used in bleach to generate chlorine dioxide.

Stability
Chlorites tend to decompose rapidly, some even explosively, upon heating. A few bromites have been isolated, but no iodites have.

References

Halites